Jonathan Nicholas Grant (born October 15, 1993) is a Canadian soccer player who plays as a defender for York United FC in the Canadian Premier League.

Early life
Grant began playing youth soccer at age three with Wexford SC. When he was 15, he joined Sigma FC.

In 2012, Grant committed to join Yavapai College.

Club career
In 2014, he played with Sigma FC in League1 Ontario. After the season, he was invited to train with the first team and reserves of Belgian club Genk.

On May 15, 2015, after a month-long trial, he signed a professional contract with USL club FC Montreal, the second team of Major League Soccer club Montreal Impact. He made his debut the same day against the Charleston Battery.

In December 2015, he signed with the Swope Park Rangers for the 2016 season. He scored his first goal for the club in a 3–0 win over Orange County Blues FC on July 23, 2016.

In 2017, he returned to his former club Sigma FC in League1 Ontario. He was named Defender of the Year and a league First-Team All-Star.

In February 2018, Grant signed with Swedish Division 1 Norra club Nyköpings BIS for the 2018 season. However, he suffered an injury in pre-season and would miss the entire 2018 season due to surgery, so he and the club agreed to terminate the contract by mutual consent in June 2018.

In February 2019, he signed with Forge FC of the Canadian Premier League. He scored his first goal on August 25, 2019 against Cavalry FC. Injuries limited his play time over his first two seasons with the club. In February 2021, he extended his contract with the club. After the 2022 season, his option for 2023 was declined by the club.

In March 2023, he signed with York United.

International career
Grant is eligible to play for Canada, where he was born,  and Guyana, where his parents are from.

Grant received his first call-up to Canadian national team on January 9, 2015 for a pair of friendlies against Iceland. However, he did not appear in either of the two matches. In June 2015, he was called up to the Canada U23 for the 2015 Pan Am Games. In September 2015, he was named to the squad for the 2015 CONCACAF Men's Olympic Qualifying Championship.

He has begun the process to obtain a Guyanese passport, with the goal of representing the country at senior level.

Honours

Club
Forge FC
Canadian Premier League: 2019, 2020, 2022

Individual
League1 Ontario Defender of the Year: 2017
League1 Ontario First Team All Star: 2017

References

External links

1993 births
Living people
Association football defenders
Canadian soccer players
Soccer people from Ontario
People from Pickering, Ontario
Canadian sportspeople of Guyanese descent
Canadian expatriate soccer players
Expatriate soccer players in the United States
Canadian expatriate sportspeople in the United States
Expatriate footballers in Sweden
Canadian expatriate sportspeople in Sweden
Yavapai Roughriders men's soccer players
FC Montreal players
Sporting Kansas City II players
Nyköpings BIS players
Forge FC players
League1 Ontario players
USL Championship players
Canadian Premier League players
Canada men's under-23 international soccer players
Footballers at the 2015 Pan American Games
Pan American Games competitors for Canada
Sigma FC players
York United FC players